Alor Gajah is a town and district seat of Alor Gajah District in the Malaysian state of Malacca. It is governed by Alor Gajah Municipal Council, which was formerly known as Alor Gajah District Council  from 1 July 1978 until 1 May 2003.

Etymology
Alor Gajah used to be one of the forest areas believed to be the routes (Malay: alor) for wild elephants (Malay: gajah).

Climate

Economy

Alor Gajah is home to Honda Malaysia's car manufacturing plant, which assembling cars for the local market and also selected automotive parts for Honda's overall ASEAN market and also local biscuit producer - Julie's manufacturing plant.

Education
Yayasan Alor Gajah College of Technology (KT-YAGA; Malay: Kolej Teknologi Yayasan Alor Gajah) Alor Gajah

Tourist attractions
 Alor Gajah British Graveyard
 Alor Gajah Square - A town square which features a large bronze sculpture of a kris (dagger).
 Freeport A'Famosa Outlet Village

Health
 Alor Gajah Hospital

Transportation
 AG Sentral Bus Terminal

Gallery

See also
 Malacca City
 Hang Tuah Jaya
 Jasin

References

External links

 Alor Gajah

Towns in Malacca
2003 establishments in Malaysia